The Crystal River National Wildlife Refuge is part of the United States National Wildlife Refuge (NWR) System, located in Kings Bay, in the town of Crystal River, and consists of 20 islands and several small parcels of land. The  refuge (only accessible by boat) was established in 1983, to protect the West Indian manatee.

Management
The Crystal River NWR administration was changed from the Chassahowitzka National Wildlife Refuge Complex to the Crystal River Complex headquartered in Crystal River, Florida. The complex manages Chassahowitzka National Wildlife Refuge, Crystal River Preserve State Park, as well as the three 'Tampa Bay Refuges'; Egmont Key NWR, Passage Key NWR, and the Pinellas NWR.

References

External links
 
 Crystal River National Wildlife Refuge

Protected areas of Citrus County, Florida
National Wildlife Refuges in Florida
Protected areas established in 1983